The 1976–77 Czechoslovak Extraliga season was the 34th season of the Czechoslovak Extraliga, the top level of ice hockey in Czechoslovakia. 12 teams participated in the league, and TJ SONP Kladno won the championship.

Regular season

1. Liga-Qualification 

 Slezan Opava – Dukla Trenčín 2:4 (7:2, 3:0, 0:5, 2:3, 2:5, 3:4)

External links
History of Czechoslovak ice hockey

Czechoslovak Extraliga seasons
Czech
1976–77 in Czechoslovak ice hockey